The Courier-Post is a morning daily newspaper that serves South Jersey in the Delaware Valley. It is based in Cherry Hill, New Jersey, and serves most of Burlington, Camden, and Gloucester counties. The paper has 30,313 daily paid subscribers and 41,078 on Sunday.

As the fifth-largest newspaper published in New Jersey, the Courier-Posts main competitors are The Philadelphia Inquirer across the Delaware River in Pennsylvania, and the Burlington County Times and South Jersey Times in South Jersey.

Established in 1875, the Post moved to Camden in 1879. It merged with The Telegram in 1899 to become The Post & Telegram. In 1926, The Post & Telegram and the Camden Courier consolidated under owner J. David Stern.

The merged paper was bought by the Gannett newspaper chain in 1959.

References

External links 
 
 Mobile version
 New Jersey Insider: Newspapers A–D

Camden County, New Jersey
Cherry Hill, New Jersey
Gannett publications
Newspapers published in New Jersey
Newspapers established in 1875
1875 establishments in New Jersey